Alexander Hellström (born 17 April 1987) is a Swedish former professional ice hockey defenceman, who last played for IF Björklöven of the HockeyAllsvenskan (Allsv). He was originally selected 184th overall, in the 2006 NHL Entry Draft by the St. Louis Blues.

Playing career
On May 3, 2007, he was signed to a three-year entry-level contract with the Blues, however failed to make an impression in North America before he was returned on loan for the final year of his deal to the SHL with Luleå HF in the 2009–10 season.

On March 25, 2015, Hellström agreed to a two-year contract to return to the SHL with Örebro HK.

References

External links

1987 births
Living people
Alaska Aces (ECHL) players
IF Björklöven players
People from Falun
HC Lev Poprad players
Luleå HF players
Peoria Rivermen (AHL) players
St. Louis Blues draft picks
HK Poprad players
HC Sibir Novosibirsk players
Swedish ice hockey defencemen
Örebro HK players
Sportspeople from Dalarna County
Swedish expatriate ice hockey players in the United States
Swedish expatriate sportspeople in Russia
Swedish expatriate sportspeople in Slovakia
Expatriate ice hockey players in Russia
Expatriate ice hockey players in Slovakia